Phaeochlaena hazara is a moth of the family Notodontidae first described by Arthur Gardiner Butler in 1871. It is found in Brazil, Ecuador, Peru and French Guiana.

The species is part of the tiger stripe mimicry complex and mimics Ithomia iphianassa, Stalachtis calliope and Chetone histrio.

References

Moths described in 1871
Notodontidae of South America